Muhamad Danish Haziq bin Saipul Hisham (born 12 September 1997) is a Malaysian professional footballer who plays as a right-back for Malaysia Super League club Penang on loan from Perak.

Club career 
After playing for UiTM in the 2020 Malaysia Super League, Danish moved to Perak for the 2021 season.

International career 
Danish captained the Malaysia national under-19 team. In 2019, he was called up for the under-23 team.

References

External links 
 

1997 births
Living people
People from Negeri Sembilan
Malaysian footballers
Association football fullbacks
Negeri Sembilan FA players
UiTM FC players
Perak F.C. players
Penang F.C. players
Malaysia Super League players
Malaysia youth international footballers